Nammanna Don is a 2012 released Kannada comedy film starring Ramesh Aravind, Mona Parvaresh and Sanathini in the lead roles. Ramesh himself has directed and written the script with DBC Shekar for the movie. Mathew Manu is the music director of the film. Ramesh's brother-in-law, Ravi Joshi has produced the venture under Lava Kush Productions.

Cast 
 Ramesh Aravind as Dr. Arjun
 Mona Parvaresh as Malini 
 Sanathini
 Raju Talikote as Muthu 
 Rajendra Karanth
 Nitesh Nittur as Malpani
 Sunayana Suresh
 Veena Bhat
 Achyuth Rao
 Layendra

Soundtrack
Mathews Manu has scored background music and also three songs for the soundtrack.

 "Ee Jeeva Ninagaagi" - Rajesh Krishnan
 "Bongu Bongu" - Jogi Sunitha
 "Jumbalaka Sakkath" - Mathews Manu

Critical reception
Srikanth Srinivasa from Rediff.com scored the film at 3 out of 5 stars and says "Mathew who has also scored the music has done well. There's a flashmob sequence in a mall that has been picturised well while taking the shoppers by surprise. Nam Anna Don is a light-hearted movie. It will bring a smile on your face". A critic from Bangalore Mirror wrote  "Nam Anna Don is better than most of the recent films of Ramesh. But it is not as good as Rama Shama Bhama that it is being compared to. It will not disappoint, but at the same time it is not a compulsive film". A critic from DNA wrote "One of the best things about the film is the complete absence of violence and being able to send a message through humour; yes, you can definitely take your family". A critic from News18 India wrote "Krishna Kumar's camera work is good, but he could have shot night sequences with more lights. Editor Soundar's work is crisp. 'Nammanna Don' is a fun-cum-message-oriented film which should not be missed".

References

2012 films
2010s Kannada-language films
Films directed by Ramesh Aravind